Miller's Crossing is a 1990 American neo-noir gangster film written, directed and produced by the Coen brothers and starring Gabriel Byrne, Marcia Gay Harden, John Turturro, Jon Polito, J. E. Freeman, and Albert Finney. The plot concerns a power struggle between two rival gangs and how the protagonist, Tom Reagan (Byrne), plays both sides against each other.

In 2005, Time chose Miller's Crossing as one of the 100 greatest films made since the inception of the periodical. Time critic Richard Corliss called it a "noir with a touch so light, the film seems to float on the breeze like the frisbee of a fedora sailing through the forest".

Plot

Tom Reagan is the right-hand man for Irish mobster Leo O'Bannon, a political boss who runs an unnamed U.S. city during Prohibition.  Leo sets off a mob war when he extends protection to his girlfriend's brother, a bookie named Bernie Bernbaum, who is skimming off of the match fixing scheme of Leo's rival, the Italian gangster Johnny Caspar.  The situation is further complicated by the fact that behind his back, Leo’s girlfriend, Verna, is also sleeping with Tom.

Despite his own relationship with Verna, Tom presses Leo to give up her brother to Caspar. When the war heats up, with an assassination attempt on Leo, Tom tries to persuade Leo that he is foolish to protect Bernie on Verna's behalf, making the point by revealing his affair with her. Leo publicly beats Tom and cuts ties with both him and Verna.

Cast out and needing work, Tom turns to Caspar. As a loyalty test, Caspar commands Tom to kill Bernie, an awkward request given Tom’s relationship with Bernie’s sister. With Caspar’s henchmen in tow, Tom leads Bernie to his execution in the woods at a spot called Miller’s Crossing. Bernie grovels for his life, pleading "Look in your heart". Tom fakes the killing by firing his gun into the ground and orders Bernie to leave town. Caspar’s henchmen, who are within earshot but cannot see the two men, are fooled and neglect to check for the body before leaving with Tom.

With Leo weakened, Caspar takes his place as city boss, controlling the police and using them to destroy Leo's operations.

Within Caspar’s gang, there is tension between Tom and Caspar’s trusted enforcer, the brutal Eddie Dane ("the Dane"). Upon learning that his men didn't actually see Tom kill Bernie, the Dane takes Tom back to Miller's Crossing to verify that Bernie's body is there. Tom expects to find no corpse and to be executed for it, but instead the group finds a decomposing body that had been shot in the face and disfigured beyond recognition by birds. The Dane and his men assume the body is that of Bernie, but it is actually that of the Dane’s lover, a man named Mink, whom Bernie had secretly killed and placed as a decoy where his own body should have been. Tom is now vulnerable if the Dane or Caspar discovers the identity of the body, a fact that Bernie uses in attempt to blackmail Tom into killing Caspar.

With Bernie supposedly dead, someone continues to cut into Caspar’s match fix, and Tom and the Dane each try to convince Caspar that the other is behind it. Tom uses the sudden disappearance of Mink to sow suspicion about the Dane by insinuating that Mink has gone into hiding after he and the Dane betrayed Caspar. Caspar must decide between Tom and the Dane, a dilemma he resolves by shooting the Dane in the head as Tom looks on.

Tom then thins out his rivals by engineering a surprise meeting between Bernie and Caspar, knowing that the first one to be seen by the other is likely to be killed. Shortly after the arranged time, Tom arrives to discover that Bernie has killed Caspar. Tom tricks Bernie into surrendering his gun and declares his intent to kill him in retribution for his blackmail. Bernie again begs for mercy, saying, as he did at Miller’s Crossing, "Look in your heart" but this time Tom asks rhetorically "What heart?" and shoots him dead.

With Caspar and the Dane dead, Leo resumes his post as the only boss in town. At Bernie’s burial, Verna, now back in Leo's good graces, reacts coldly to Tom and walks back to her car. Leo notifies Tom that Verna has proposed to marry him. He offers Tom his job back but Tom rejects the offer and stays behind, watching Leo as he walks away.

Cast

Production
While writing the screenplay, the Coen brothers tentatively titled the film The Bighead—their nickname for Tom Reagan. The first image they conceived was that of a black hat coming to rest in a forest clearing; then, a gust of wind lifts it into the air, sending it flying down an avenue of trees. This image closes the film's opening credit sequence.

Because of the intricate, dense plot, the Coens suffered from writer's block with the script. They stayed with a close friend of theirs at the time, William Preston Robertson in Saint Paul, Minnesota, hoping that a change of scenery might help. After watching Baby Boom one night, they returned to New York City and wrote Barton Fink (in three weeks) before resuming the Miller's Crossing screenplay.

The budget was reported by film industry magazines as around $14 million, but the Coens have said that the film cost "substantially less" than that. According to Paul Coughlin, "The casting of Byrne allows for the psychological assurance, self-confidence and icy demeanour to be physically reproduced in the sturdy and unruffled presence of the tall and lean actor. Tom is 'a man who walks behind a man, whispers in his ear', he is the brains behind Leo's operation, and he is the heartless centre of Miller's Crossing." Although he was a native Irishman playing a lieutenant to an Irish mobster, the Coens did not originally want Gabriel Byrne to use his own accent in the film. Byrne argued that his dialogue was structured in such a way that it was a good fit for his accent and after he tried it, the Coens agreed.

During casting they had envisioned Trey Wilson (who played Nathan Arizona in their previous film Raising Arizona) as gangster boss Leo O'Bannon but two days before principal photography began, Wilson died from a brain hemorrhage and Finney was cast. Roger Westcombe calls Finney's portrayal of Leo "perfectly nuanced in a brilliant performance". Finney also appears in drag in a cameo as an elderly female ladies' room attendant.

The Coens cast family and friends in minor roles. Sam Raimi, director and friend of the Coens, appears as the snickering gunman at the siege of the Sons of Erin social club, while Frances McDormand, Joel Coen's wife, appears as the mayor's secretary. The role of The Swede was written for Peter Stormare but he could not be cast since he was playing Hamlet (a role often referred to as "the Dane"). J. E. Freeman was cast and the name of the character was changed to The Dane, while Stormare went on to be featured in Fargo and The Big Lebowski.

The city in which the story takes place is unidentified but the film was shot in New Orleans as the Coen Brothers were attracted to its look. Ethan Coen commented in an interview, "There are whole neighborhoods here of nothing but 1929 architecture. New Orleans is sort of a depressed city; it hasn't been gentrified. There's a lot of architecture that hasn't been touched, store-front windows that haven't been replaced in the last sixty years." Principal photography ran from January 27 to April 28, 1989.

Influences
Roger Westcombe finds in the opening title sequence of a fedora being blown off its bed of fallen leaves in the forest, a subtle homage to Jean-Pierre Melville's 1963 French crime film Le Doulos, which ends with the gangster protagonist's fate underlined wistfully by the shot of his fedora coming to rest, alone in the frame, in the soil of the forest floor.

Writing in The Atlantic, Christopher Orr sees in the opening scene, in which Johnny Caspar (Jon Polito) confronts Leo O'Bannon (Albert Finney) and Tom Reagan (Gabriel Byrne) "an obvious nod to the opening of The Godfather".

Miller's Crossing quotes many gangster films and films noir. Many situations, characters and dialogue are derived from the work of Dashiell Hammett, particularly his 1931 novel The Glass Key. There are some parallels between the two stories and many scenes and lines are lifted from this novel. The relationship between Tom and Leo in the film mirrors the relationship between Ned Beaumont and Paul Madvig, the principal characters of the Hammett novel.

Another important Hammett source was his 1929 novel Red Harvest, which details the story of a gang war in a corrupt Prohibition-era American city, a war initiated by the machinations of the main character. While Miller's Crossing follows the plot and main characters of The Glass Key fairly closely, the film has no direct scenes, characters, or dialogue from Red Harvest except for using a fixed boxing fight as a plot device.

Orr also notes, "The ending of Miller’s Crossing makes even clearer reference to the immaculate final scene of The Third Man: a funeral, a protagonist abandoned by his car, who watches as the last person he cares for in the world walks away down a dirt road hemmed by trees".

Reception and legacy
Miller's Crossing opened in limited release in New York City on September 22, 1990, after premiering at the New York Film Festival the day before. It was a box-office failure at the time, making slightly more than $5 million, out of its $10–$14 million budget.

On review aggregator Rotten Tomatoes, the film has an approval rating of 93% based on 68 reviews, with an average rating of 8.2/10. The website's critical consensus reads, "Though possibly more notable for its distinctive style than an airtight story, this Coen brothers' take on the classic gangster flick features sharp dialogue, impressive cinematography, and a typically quirky cast of characters." On Metacritic, the film has a weighted average score of 76 out of 100, indicating "generally favorable reviews." Audiences polled by CinemaScore gave the film an average grade of "C-" on an A+ to F scale.

Film critic David Thomson calls the film "a superb, languid fantasia on the theme of the gangster film that repays endless viewing". Of Turturro's performance he says "This could be the finest work of one of our best supporting actors". Roger Ebert gave it 3/4 stars, stating "It is likely to be most appreciated by movie lovers who will enjoy its resonance with films of the past".

Miller's Crossing won the Critic's Award at the 2nd Yubari International Fantastic Film Festival in February 1991. It was nominated for the Grand Prix of the Belgian Syndicate of Cinema Critics.

Frank Moraes says, "Gabriel Byrne does an excellent job in this film, ... this film lives and dies on his performance". Taking particular note of the work of cinematographer Barry Sonnenfeld and production designer Dennis Gassner, Christopher Orr observed, "Miller's Crossing is an aesthetic pleasure of the highest order on nearly every level".

Time and Total Film placed it in their top 100 list. In 2010, The Guardian called it the 24th best crime movie of all-time.

Soundtrack

The score was written by Carter Burwell, his third collaboration with the Coen brothers. The main theme is based on the Irish folk ballad "Lament for Limerick". Burwell takes a traditional piece of music with some culturally relevant connection and uses it as the central motif of the broader arrangement. The main theme has been utilized in trailers for a number of other films, including The Shawshank Redemption, as well as in an ad for Caffrey's Irish Ale.

The soundtrack includes jazz tunes, such as "King Porter Stomp", reflective of the era in which the film is set. Other songs include "Danny Boy", sung by Frank Patterson, an Irish tenor, which is heard in Leo's house. Patterson can also be heard singing Jimmy Campbell's "Goodnight Sweetheart" in a scene in the Shenandoah Club.

Track listing
 "Opening Titles" – 1:53
 "Caspar Laid Out" – 1:57
 "A Man and His Hat" – 0:56
 "King Porter Stomp" (performed by Jelly Roll Morton) – 2:09
 "The Long Way Around" – 1:39
 "Miller's Crossing" – 2:35
 "After Miller's Crossing" – 0:42
 "Runnin' Wild" (performed by Joe Grey) – 3:06
 "Rage of the Dane" – 0:05
 "All a You Whores" – 0:24
 "Nightmare in the Trophy Room" – 1:37
 "He Didn't Like His Friends" – 0:24
 "Danny Boy" (performed by Frank Patterson) – 4:05
 "What Heart?" – 0:49
 "End Titles" – 4:44
 "Goodnight Sweetheart" (performed by Frank Patterson) – 0:54

See also
Two other gangster films released in the same year as Miller's Crossing :
Goodfellas
The Godfather Part III

References

External links

 
 
 

1990 crime drama films
1990 LGBT-related films
American crime drama films
American gangster films
American LGBT-related films
American neo-noir films
Films about Irish-American culture
Films about the Irish Mob
Films directed by the Coen brothers
Films scored by Carter Burwell
Films set in the 1920s
Films shot in New Orleans
Mafia films
1990s English-language films
1990s American films